Wyndham School, Egremont was a secondary school in Cumbria. Trudy Harrison, the Member of Parliament (MP) for Copeland since winning the seat at the February 2017 by-election is a former pupil.

Wyndham School Houses

In the beginning Wyndham Secondary Modern had 4 houses - Scott, Grenfell, Mallory and Livingstone (named after explorers)

When Wyndham became a comprehensive in 1964 there were 8 houses (named after the original head of houses) in 4 blocks plus Reception for 1st years and separate 6th Form block:-

Udy, Sanderson, Birch, Wright, Tindall. Johnstone, Clark and Hughes.

In 1978 8 became 4 named after local pits:

Udy/Wright - Croft; Birch/Sanderson  - Ehen; Tindall/Johnstone - Peel; Clark/Hughes - Falcon.

Reception was still a block on its own housing 1st years and a separate 6th Form block.

Reception was then closed (1985?) and 1st years went straight into their respective houses. 6th Form still a separate block.

Reception became Lonsdale in 1994.

Croft ceased to be.

6th Form moved to top of science block

Reception/Lonsdale  also housed 6th form.

The school merged with Ehenside School in 2008 and was called West Lakes Academy. The buildings were knocked down and rebuilt on the same site in 2012.

References

Educational institutions established in 1964
Educational institutions disestablished in 2012
Defunct schools in Cumbria
People educated at Wyndham School, Egremont
Egremont, Cumbria
1964 establishments in England